The 2009 WNBA Playoffs is the postseason for the Women's National Basketball Association's 2009 season.

Format
The top 4 teams from each conference qualify for the playoffs.
All 4 teams are seeded based on their standings.
For rounds one and two, the teams compete in a best-of-three format with Games 2 and 3 on the home court of the team with the higher seed.
The series for the WNBA Finals is in a best-of-five format with Games 1, 2 and 5 on the home court of the team with the higher seed.

Playoff qualifying
Eastern Conference
The following teams clinched a playoff berth in the East:
 Indiana Fever (22–12)
 Atlanta Dream (18–16)
 Detroit Shock (18–16)
 Washington Mystics (16–18)

Western Conference
The following teams clinched a playoff berth in the West:
 Phoenix Mercury (23–11)
 Seattle Storm (20–14)
 Los Angeles Sparks (18–16)
 San Antonio Silver Stars (15–19)

Bracket
This was the outlook for the 2009 WNBA playoffs. Teams in italics had home court advantage. Teams in bold advanced to the next round.  Numbers to the left of each team indicate the team's original playoffs seeding in their respective conferences.  Numbers to the right of each team indicate the number of games the team won in that round.

Eastern Conference

First round

(1) Indiana Fever vs. (4) Washington Mystics

(2) Atlanta Dream vs. (3) Detroit Shock

Conference Finals: (1) Indiana Fever vs. (3) Detroit Shock

Western Conference

First round

(1) Phoenix Mercury vs. (4) San Antonio Silver Stars

(2) Seattle Storm vs. (3) Los Angeles Sparks

Conference Finals: (1) Phoenix Mercury vs. (3) Los Angeles Sparks

WNBA Finals: (1) Phoenix Mercury vs. (1) Indiana Fever

 All times Eastern

References

Playoffs
Women's National Basketball Association Playoffs